The Afsharid dynasty was an Iranian dynasty founded by Nader Shah of the Qirqlu clan of the Turkoman Afshar tribe.

List of Afsharid monarchs

Family tree

References

Sources
 
 
 
 
 
 
 
 

Iranian Muslim dynasties
Middle Eastern dynasties
Shia dynasties
Turkic dynasties
1730s in Iran
.
.
.
.
1780s in Iran
1790s in Iran
1800s in Iran